Spring break is a secular holiday.

Spring break may also refer to:

In film
Spring Break (film),  a 1983 comedy film
Spring Break USA (also known as Spring Break USA and Spring Fever USA),  a 1989 comedy film directed by Bill Milling
Spring Breakers (2013), an American neo-noir film

In music
"Spring Break", a Cheap Trick song from the 1983 film of the same name
Spring Break (album) – College Boyys album
Spring Break '87,  a 1987 concert performed by Australian rock group Crowded House at Daytona Beach, Florida, United States

In television
"Spring Break" (CSI: Miami), a 2003 episode of the TV series CSI: Miami
"Spring Break" (Modern Family), a 2015 episode of the TV series Modern Family

See also
Spring brake, a component of an air brake (road vehicle), a braking system for vehicles